The 1948 Kansas gubernatorial election was held on November 2, 1948. Incumbent Republican Frank Carlson defeated Democratic nominee Randolph Carpenter with 57.00% of the vote.

Primary elections
Primary elections were held on August 3, 1948.

Democratic primary

Candidates 
Randolph Carpenter, former U.S. Representative
Ewell Stewart

Results

Republican primary

Candidates
Frank Carlson, incumbent Governor
James A. McClain
William P. Lambertson, former U.S. Representative

Results

General election

Candidates
Major party candidates 
Frank Carlson, Republican
Randolph Carpenter, Democratic

Other candidates
N.W. Nice, Prohibition
W. W. Tamplin, Socialist

Results

References

1948
Kansas
Gubernatorial